The following is a partial list of the "J" codes for Medical Subject Headings (MeSH), as defined by the United States National Library of Medicine (NLM).

This list continues the information at List of MeSH codes (J01). Codes following these are found at List of MeSH codes (K01). For other MeSH codes, see List of MeSH codes.

The source for this content is the set of 2006 MeSH Trees from the NLM.

– food and beverages

– beverages
  – alcoholic beverages
  – absinthe
  – beer
  – wine
  – carbonated beverages
  – coffee
  – milk
  – cultured milk products
  – infant formula
  – milk, human
  – milk substitutes
  – infant formula
  – soy milk
  – mineral waters
  – tea

– food
  – bread
  – candy
  – chewing gum
  – cereals
  – avena sativa
  – fagopyrum
  – hordeum
  – oryza sativa
  – panicum
  – secale cereale
  – triticum
  – zea mays
  – condiments
  – spices
  – black pepper
  – crops, agricultural
  – animal feed
  – avena sativa
  – fagopyrum
  – helianthus
  – lolium
  – medicago sativa
  – mustard plant
  – panicum
  – secale cereale
  – silage
  – soybeans
  – zea mays
  – dairy products
  – butter
  – cheese
  – ice cream
  – margarine
  – milk
  – cultured milk products
  – yogurt
  – infant formula
  – milk, human
  – dietary fats
  – butter
  – dietary fats, unsaturated
  – corn oil
  – cottonseed oil
  – safflower oil
  – sesame oil
  – soybean oil
  – margarine
  – dietary fiber
  – dietary supplements
  – probiotics
  – yeast, dried
  – eggs
  – egg white
  – egg yolk
  – flour
  – food additives
  – fat substitutes
  – flavoring agents
  – calcium citrate
  – safrole
  – sweetening agents
  – food preservatives
  – food, genetically modified
  – foods, specialized
  – food, formulated
  – infant formula
  – food, fortified
  – health food
  – infant food
  – infant formula
  – fruit
  – honey
  – meat
  – meat products
  – poultry
  – poultry products
  – seafood
  – fish products
  – fish flour
  – shellfish
  – molasses
  – nuts
  – seeds
  – vegetables
  – allium
  – garlic
  – onions
  – brassica
  – capsicum
  – chicory
  – chive
  – cucumis sativus
  – daucus carota
  – fabaceae
  – arachis hypogaea
  – peas
  – soybeans
  – soy foods
  – soy milk
  – soybean proteins
  – lettuce
  – lycopersicon esculentum
  – mustard plant
  – rheum
  – shallots
  – solanum tuberosum
  – spinacia oleracea

The list continues at List of MeSH codes (K01).

J02